Season Of Sweets is Modey Lemon's well-received fourth album. The band embarked on a tour to promote the album shortly after its release.

Track listing
"The Bear Comes Back Down the Mountain" - 5:21
"The Peacock's Eye" - 5:29
"It Made You Dumb" - 3:49
"Sacred Place" - 4:48
"Become A Monk" - 4:19
"Ice Fields" - 7:10
"Milk Moustache" - 3:09
"Season Of Sweets" - 2:54
"Live Like Kids" - 10:27

Personnel
Paul Quattrone - Drums
Phil Boyd - Vocals, guitar and synthesizers
Jason Kirker - Bass and keyboards

External links
Pitchfork link
Dusted link
iTunes link

2008 albums
Modey Lemon albums
Birdman Records albums